Dahin Sheli is a mixed public junior high school located in Norrip village along the Tamale-Bolgatanga Road in the Tamale metropolis of the Northern region of Ghana. It was established in 1990, to educate the children of workers of the Northern Region Rural Integrated Project (NORRIP) until the year 2000, when it was absorbed by the government as a public school for children from all walks of life.

References

Schools in Ghana
Schools in Northern Region (Ghana)
Educational institutions established in 1990
1990 establishments in Ghana